Austramathes is a genus of moths of the family Noctuidae.  It is endemic to New Zealand.

Species 
The following species are found within the genus:

 Austramathes purpurea 
 Austramathes fortis
 Austramathes squaliolus
 Austramathes coelacantha
 Austramathes pessota

References

Cuculliinae
Endemic fauna of New Zealand
Endemic moths of New Zealand